Lieblich may refer to:

 Irene Lieblich (1923–2008), a Polish-born artist
 22534 Lieblich, an asteroid